Raja Nagar is a residential township in Chennai, India. It is located in Neelangarai, a suburb of Chennai, situated about six kilometers from the city center of Adyar. 

The neighboring areas include:

 Palavakkam to the north;
 VGP Golden Beach to the south;
 Bay of Bengal on the east side; and
 IT Highway on the western part.

References

Neighbourhoods in Chennai